Frank Wells (30 October 1909 – 7 March 1993) was an  Australian rules footballer who played with North Melbourne in the Victorian Football League (VFL).

Wells came down to Melbourne from Chiltern and played with Alphington initially, before joining the North Melbourne Football Club.

Notes

External links 

1909 births
1993 deaths
Australian rules footballers from Victoria (Australia)
North Melbourne Football Club players